This is a list of caravanserais in Azerbaijan.

List of caravanserais

References

Caravanserais